M. Rajasekara Murthy (10 May 1922 – 5 December 2010) was an Indian politician, who was a member 7th Lok Sabha the lower house of the Indian Parliament from the Lok Sabha constituency of Mysore in Karnataka. He also participated in the Freedom Struggle.

Early life and background 
Rajasekara Murthy was born on May 10, 1922 at Malangi Village in T. Narasipur Taluk of Mysore District. Shri Madappa was his father.

Personal life 
M. Rajasekara Murthy married Shrimati M. Rajamma (since deceased) and couple had 5 daughters.

Position held

Also served as 

 Director in many public limited and private limited companies.
 President of Co-operative Bank.
 Honorary Secretary of various educational institutions, and hostels.
 Secretary of Karnataka Congress Legislature Party.
 Treasurer of Karnataka Congress (O) Legislature Party.
 Member of various committees of Karnataka Legislature.

Political career
Murthy had held several senior cabinet minister positions in Karnataka Government including the important portfolios of Excise, Industry, Finance and Revenue. He was also a union minister under the then former prime minister Sri PV Narasimha Rao's cabinet.

A close follower of former Congress President S. Nijalingappa and a close associate of former Chief Minister Veerendra Patil, Murthy had served in their Ministries and also with M. Veerappa Moily, before he moved to Rajya Sabha.

He was regarded as one of the most powerful Lingayat leaders, a powerful community dominating the political scenario of the State.

He was a member of Lok Sabha once and represented Rajya Sabha thrice with Congress, BJP and JD(S) party tickets during the last three terms. He was a Minister of State (independent charge) holding the Ministries of Surface Transport and Ports in the P.V. Narasimha Rao Ministry.

Known for his discipline and administrative acumen, Murthy revived the financial position of Karnataka when he took over as Finance Minister when Veerendra Patil became the Chief Minister for the second time in 1989. 
It was during Veerappa Moily's regime as CM that Murthy as Revenue Minister unearthed landscam in Mysore taluk, which led to suspension and sacking of government officials for colluding with land grabbers, creating fictitious documents.

He was the cousin brother of former Union Minister M.S. Gurupadaswamy.

Entering the first Assembly in 1952 from T. Narasipura constituency, he was elected to Assembly again five times.

A close aide of the then Chief Minister S. Nijalingappa, Murthy became the Minister for Commerce and Industry.

Opposition Leader Siddharamaiah was once a contender for Chamundeswari seat represented by Murthy. It was in 1989 that Murthy of Congress defeated Siddharamaiah of JD(S) by 6892 votes. Murthy got 42,892 votes, while Siddu 36,000 votes.

Murthy has been the Member of Parliament-Rajya Sabha many times. He won one of the Rajya Sabha seats by defeating the business tycoon Vijaya Mallya. Mallya was very confident about his win due to his wealth but did not consider the factor that people and their representatives trusted Mr. Murthy and his principles and taught Dr. Vijaya Mallya that his money, power and lobby were as good as his Kingfisher Airlines against the loyalty and trust Mr. Murthy commanded.

He was a known party hopper. Initially he was with Congress, later joined BJP followed by JD(S). This is because he was very strict, honest and disciplined which irritated the high command of their respective parties who are well branded for corruption and bribery, things that go against the morals and principles of Mr. Murthy. Hence he was always troubled and had to shift parties. It was not his desire to jump, but the great leaders who are the brand ambassadors of corruption brought this circumstance. He had to become the CM of Karnataka back in the early 1990s but was denied the change due to the moral administration of his superiors and peers. Mr. Murthy was a true follower of the Great Mahatma Gandhi and his values unlike his superiors who also are the followers of our Great Mahatma Gandhi, but on the printed paper (Rupee Notes Followers of Gandhi).

Death
Murthy died at 11.30 pm on 5 December 2010 at Ram Manohar Lohia Hospital in Delhi. His body was brought to Bangalore on 6 December 2010 and the state funeral was held at Chamrajanagar on 7 December 2010.

External links
 Profile on Rajya Sabha website

References

1922 births
2010 deaths
Rajya Sabha members from Karnataka
India MPs 1984–1989
India MPs 1980–1984
Politicians from Mysore
Lok Sabha members from Karnataka
Bharatiya Janata Party politicians from Karnataka
Indian National Congress politicians from Karnataka
Janata Dal (Secular) politicians
Mysore MLAs 1952–1957
Mysore MLAs 1957–1962
Mysore MLAs 1962–1967
Mysore MLAs 1967–1972
Mysore MLAs 1972–1977
Members of the Mysore Legislature
Karnataka MLAs 1989–1994